Randall Edward Plunkett, 15th Baron Dunsany (5 September 1804 – 7 April 1852) was an Anglo-Irish peer and Conservative politician.

Plunkett was the son of Edward Plunkett, 14th Baron Dunsany and his first wife, Hon. Charlotte Louisa Lawless. 

On 29 June 1835, he was declared elected on petition as the Member of Parliament for Drogheda, after his opponent Andrew O'Dwyer had been deemed ineligible. He represented the seat as a Conservative until 1837. On 11 December 1848, he inherited his father's title, becoming Baron of Dunsany. In 1850 Dunsany was elected as a representative peer for Ireland and took his seat in the House of Lords.

On 29 December 1838, he married Elizabeth Evelyn. Dunsany was succeeded in his title by his younger brother, Edward.

References

1804 births
1852 deaths
19th-century Anglo-Irish people
Conservative Party (UK) hereditary peers
Irish Conservative Party MPs
Members of the Parliament of the United Kingdom for County Louth constituencies (1801–1922)
UK MPs 1835–1837
Barons of Dunsany